Avdarma is a commune and village in the Gagauz Autonomous Territorial Unit of the Republic of Moldova. The 2004 census listed the commune as having a population of 3,564 people. 
3,356 of the inhabitants belonged to the Gagauz people; minorities included 47 Russians, 43 Ukrainians, 42 Moldovans, 32 Bulgarians, and 25 Romani people.
The History and Ethnography Museum in the village was opened 2011.

References

Avdarma